Edward Doyle may refer to:
Edward Doyle (Irish politician), Irish Labour Party politician
Edward C. Doyle (1882–1972), Canadian politician in the Nova Scotia House of Assembly
Eddie Doyle (American football) (1898–1942), American football player
Eddie Doyle (hurler) (1897–1948), Irish hurler
Ed Doyle (politician) (born 1935), Canadian politician
Ed Doyle (American football) (1905–1942), American football offensive lineman
Edward P. Doyle (Staten Island), member of the 109th New York State Legislature from Staten Island
Edward P. Doyle (Brooklyn) (1890–1972), New York assemblyman 1926 to 1937, see 149th New York State Legislature